Devil Inside may refer to:

 "The Devil Inside" (The Vampire Diaries), an episode of the TV series The Vampire Diaries
 "Devil Inside" (Utada song), a 2004 song released by Utada
 "Devil Inside" (INXS song)
 "Devil Inside", a song by Tim Sköld
 "The Devil Inside", an early song by The Word Alive from their self-titled EP
 The Devil Inside (video game)
 The Devil Inside (film)